We're Alive — A Story of Survival is a horror/post apocalyptic audio drama, originally released in podcast form. Its story follows a large group of survivors of a zombie apocalypse in downtown Los Angeles, California. 

We're Alive premiered May 4, 2009 on iTunes, and concluded its fourth and last season on July 29, 2014. When in production, the We're Alive series released 3 first-run episodes a month, totaling 36 episodes a season. The compiled-season version of the show is produced by Wayland Productions, and is distributed through CD/Digital downloads by Blackstone Audio and also through the Rusty Quill Network.

Background 
We're Alive started early in 2009 when creator, Kc Wayland, originally outlined the story for a pitch for television. At the time he saw there was a gap in programming that could be filled by a horror survival series.  He designed a show that would take advantage of the repeated set, the tower, and then branch out from there as the show would get more popular. After the initial story and character outlines were created, he then proceeded to talk with other film producers seeing if there would be a way to get the show on broadcast television.

After not being able to successfully pitch the idea, Wayland then decided to produce the show as an audio drama.  The concept for self-production was a "if you build it, they will come"; in regards to both listeners and producers. In late April 2009, Wayland met with Shane Salk and pitched the idea. Together they settled on the serialized audio format. Wayland and Salk went on to produce the first two seasons, and then Grayson Stone (an intern in season 1 and 2) and Wayland continued to produce the final two seasons.

Sequels and Spinoffs 
In 2015, Wayland announced a follow-up podcast mini-series titled We're Alive: Lockdown. The project was crowdfunded through Kickstarter, raising $54,774 of its $50,000 goal. Lockdown takes place within Twin Towers Jail. Six inmates, and the prison guards assigned to them have found themselves trapped in the inescapable confines of T-block during the lockdown following a prison riot. Boundaries of trust are pushed to the limit as the survivors must learn to work together if they have any hope of escaping the horde of infected and the deadly secret that lies within the walls of Twin Tower Jail. 

In 2019, Wayland released a new follow-up chapter to the series titled We're Alive: Goldrush. This entry in the We’re Alive canon is described as a “spaghetti-western tale of humor, horror and heartbreak”. The series follows four post-apocalyptic soldiers as they stumble across clues to a hidden gold heist stash. Since gold retains value even after the apocalypse, they plot to track down the prize for themselves. Goldrush was shortlisted as a BBC Audio Drama Award for best podcast. 

Since late 2019, hints and images have been shared on the official We’re Alive website and by Writer/Director Kc Wayland on social media regarding a possible true sequel to the show entitled We’re Alive: Descendants. According to Wayland the writing for this show has been ongoing since We’re Alive: A Story of Survival concluded in 2014.  We're Alive: Descendants has been announced with Wayland Productions announcing a April 5th 2022 release.

Format 
There were several factors that led Wayland to the audio-only format.  In limiting the visuals, the story would be able to explore limitless possibilities in settings and situations not fully explored by this genre.  Being a "horror", the power of sound and "what you can't see" could be utilized in a powerful way.  Using no visuals also limited the vastness of production. Actors could come in once every two months for a full day of recording that would cover six full episodes (2 chapters).

Production process 
A typical chapter is about sixty pages long, and is recorded by the actors in a recording stage in Orange County, CA. A typical day runs about six to eight hours of raw recording.  From there, a voice cutter then goes through the session and separates just the usable lines, and then passes it onto another editor who then lays in the initial sound effects and pacing.  The last stage then goes back to Wayland, who acts as the supervising sound editor and covers the last stage of production, often doing a large amount of foley and music selections.

Release dates and episode length 
In a typical month, We're Alive produced three episodes comprising one chapter, taking one week off between chapters. Twelve chapters make up one season, and there are four seasons with a total of forty eight chapters. Each episode is approximately twenty minutes, making each chapter about an hour long.

Published version 
Blackstone Audio has published all three seasons currently available: Season 1, Season 2, Season 3.

Awards 
We're Alive was nominated in 2012 for the Best Audio Drama in the Audio Publishing Awards.
In the same year, it was named "Best of 2012" in the iTunes Arts category.
Other awards won by the series include:

 4th Annual Dead Letter Award
 2009 Gold Ogle Award
 2010 Silver Ogle Award
 Parsec Award Winner Best Speculative Fiction Audio Drama Long Form 2014
 Parsec Award Finalist Best Speculative Fiction Audio Drama Long Form 2010 2011, 2012, and 2013

Cast

Jim Gleason as Michael
Shane Salk as Angel
Nate Geez as Saul
Elisa Eliot as Pegs
Claire Dodin as Riley
Scott Marvin as Burt
Tammy Klein as Kelly
Jay Olegario as Datu
Blaire Byhower as Lizzy
Kevin Flood as Kalani
Jenna McCombie as Scratch
Bob Bergen as Skittles
Ben Jurand as Durai
Mark Jeffrey Miller as Gatekeeper
Shirley Jordan as Tanya
Otto Sturcke as Victor
Greg Miller as Pete
Carl Schwaber as Bixby
Cooper Wise as Supervisor
Jim Kane as Marcus
Katie Keane as Amy
Erik Wargo as Steven
Glenn Hoeffner as Glenn
David Pevsner as Tardust
Stuart Kennon as Bricks
Manley Woods as Bill
Nico Marvin as Tommy
Rebekah Roberts as Samantha
Michael Ray Clarke as Latch
Omar Leyva as Fernando
Richard Tatum as Pippin
Brett Newton as Puck
Christian Vieira as Carl Thomas
Constance Parng as Chinwe
Julia Kelly as Hannah
Tony Rey as Robbins
Shaun Lewin as Muldoon
Graham Beightol as Max
James Stebick as Jay

Notable guest voices
In addition the regular cast — which includes Jim Gleason who starred on the 2013-2014 season of American Horror Story — there have been a number of notable guest voices on We're Alive.  These names include Bob Bergen (current voice of Porky Pig), Seth Peterson from Burn Notice, and Greg Miller.

Episodes

Season 1

Season 2

Season 3

Season 4

References

External links 
 

Audio podcasts
Horror podcasts
Scripted podcasts
American radio dramas
Zombies and revenants in popular culture
Nerdist Industries
2009 podcast debuts
2014 podcast endings